Twenty Six Days from the Life of Dostoyevsky is a 1981 Soviet biographical film about writer Fyodor Dostoevsky directed by Aleksandr Zarkhi. It was entered into the 31st Berlin International Film Festival where Anatoly Solonitsyn won the Silver Bear for Best Actor.

Plot
The film is set in October 1866. Dostoyevski is experiencing a hard and dark period in his life, including his wife's funeral, then his brother's, debts and an unsettled personal life. He signs a leonine contract with the publisher Stellovsky which dictates that in a short time he needs to provide the manuscript of his new novel.

On the advice of his friends, Fyodor uses services of a stenographer, one of the best course trainees of Olkhin.

For the little time that was given to him, the novel The Gambler was completed. A gentle, sincere feeling that arose between the writer and his assistant, grows into love. Anna, having overcome doubt, becomes his wife and loyal friend.

Cast
 Anatoly Solonitsyn as Fyodor Mikhailovich Dostoyevsky
 Yevgeniya Simonova as Anna Grigoryevna Snitkina
 Ewa Szykulska as Appolinariya Suslova
 Nikolai Denisov
 Yevgeni Dvorzhetsky
 Yuri Katin-Yartsev

References

External links

1981 films
1980s biographical drama films
Soviet biographical drama films
Russian biographical drama films
1980s Russian-language films
Films directed by Aleksandr Zarkhi
Films set in 1866
Films set in the Russian Empire